Yoo Hyun-goo ( born 25 January 1983) is a South Korean-born Indonesian professional footballer who plays as a defensive midfielder for Liga 2 club Sriwijaya. He previously played for Pohang Steelers, Bucheon SK, Jeju United, Gwangju Sangmu, Super Reds, Barito Putera, Kalteng Putra, and Semen Padang.

Career statistics 
As of 1 October 2022

Honours

Club

Semen Padang
Indonesia Premier League: 2011-12
Indonesian Community Shield: 2013
Sriwijaya
 President's Cup third place: 2018
 East Kalimantan Governor Cup: 2018
Persis Solo
 Liga 2: 2021

References

External links 
 

1983 births
Living people
Association football midfielders
Indonesian people of Korean descent
South Korean footballers
South Korean expatriate footballers
Pohang Steelers players
Jeju United FC players
Gimcheon Sangmu FC players
Semen Padang F.C. players
Sriwijaya F.C. players
K League 1 players
Singapore Premier League players
Liga 1 (Indonesia) players
Expatriate footballers in Singapore
South Korean expatriate sportspeople in Singapore
Expatriate footballers in Indonesia
South Korean expatriate sportspeople in Indonesia
Naturalised citizens of Indonesia
Sportspeople from Daegu